{{Infobox television
| image          = Act_of_Violence_newspaper_ad.png
| image_upright  =
| image_alt      = 
| caption        = Sydney Morning Herald advertisement, 23 Mar 1959
| genre          = 
| creator        = 
| based_on       = 1956 script Act of Violence
| writer         = Iain MacCormick
| screenplay     = 
| story          = 
| director       = Paul O'Loughlin
| starring       = 
| narrated       = 
| music          = 
| country        = Australia
| language       = English
| num_episodes   = 
| producer       = 
| editor         = 
| cinematography = 
| runtime        = 75 mins
| company        = ABC
| budget         = 
| network        = ABC
| released       =  (Sydney, live) (Melbourne, taped) 
}}Act of Violence is a 1959 television play broadcast by the Australian Broadcasting Corporation. It was based on a play by Australian writer Iain MacCormick which had previously been broadcast in Britain in 1956. This was typical of Australian television at the time - most locally produced drama consisted of adaptations of overseas stories.

Plot
It is set in the capital city of a country that has endured war and revolution and the rule of dictators.

Cast
Owen Weingott as Alexander 		
Joan Landor as Leonara 		
Annette Andre
Lou Vernon
Max Osbiston
John Barnard 		
Douglas Bladon 		
Henry Gilbert 		
John Gray 		
Charles McCallum 		
Robert McDarra 		
Peter Wagner 		
Ossie Wenban

Production
It was the third of MacCormick's plays to be adapted by the ABC, the others being The Small Victory and The Sound of Thunder''.

An advertisement at the time said the production "was in line with ABC policy, followed since the establishment of television, regularly to present fine plays with Australian casts." The ad also claimed it was the ABC's 54th live TV drama.

See also
List of live television plays broadcast on Australian Broadcasting Corporation (1950s)

References

External links

1950s Australian television plays
Australian Broadcasting Corporation original programming
English-language television shows
Australian live television shows
Black-and-white Australian television shows
1959 television plays